{{Infobox officeholder
| honorific-prefix = 
| name = Harshvardhan Jadhav
| father = Raibhan Jadhav
| mother = Tejaswini jadhav
| image = 
| spouse = Sanjana Jadhav|Danve]])<ref name="family">{{cite news |title=Case against Danves daughter for threatening mother-in-law |url=https://www.outlookindia.com/newsscroll/case-against-danves-daughter-for-threatening-motherinlaw/1759664 |accessdate=7 September 2020 |work=Outlook India |agency=PTI |date=12 March 2020}}</ref>
| children = 1
| honorific-suffix = 
| birth_date = 1978
| birth_place = 
| image_size = 
| caption = 
| order = 
| office = Member of Maharashtra Legislative Assembly
| term_start = 2009
| term_end = 2019
| constituency = Kannad
| party = Maharashtra Navnirman SenaShiv SenaShiv Swarajya Paksha
| residence = Pishor, Kannad, Aurangabad
| occupation = Farming and Business
| education = Diploma in Business Administration at Cardiff University
| website = 
| termend = 
}}

Harshvardhan Jadhav is an Indian politician who formerly represented Kannad in Maharashtra Legislative Assembly. He has been a member of Shiv Sena, Maharashtra Navnirman Sena, Shiv Swarajya Paksha at various times in his political career.

Political career
Coming from a  political family, Jadhav joined politics somewhat reluctantly in 2004, losing the Assembly election that year as an Independent. He was elected to Vidhan Sabha in 2009 from the Kannad Assembly Constituency as a Maharashtra Navnirman Sena nominee. He won the seat for the consecutive term in 2014, but this time he was with Shiv Sena.

Jadhav contested 2019 Lok Sabha election as an independent from Aurangabad. Jadhav gained sizable Maratha support, which resulted in Shiv Sena losing the seat after having won it for 4 consecutive elections. In the aftermath, his house was pelted with stones by Shiv Sena supporters for his comments about Uddhav Thackeray. While he had floated his own party "Shiv Swarajya Paksha/Shiv Swarajya Bahujan Paksh", he contested as an Independent. He later announced that the party will continue fielding candidates in upcoming state elections.

Jadhav rejoined MNS in 2020 and was tasked with playing an influential role in Marathwada politics.

He is known for his activism for Maratha reservation and support for Maratha Kranti Morcha.

In May 2020, Jadhav announced that he has retired from politics and would support his wife further her political ambitions.

Controversies
In 2011, Jadhav was involved in assault case where he claimed he was assaulted by the police. A counter-case was filed by the police alleging he was the one who instigated the attacks. Two cops were suspended after the incidence and in 2017 Jadhav sentenced to one year in jail. In 2014, He was again in the news for slapping a security officer.

In March 2020, a case was registered against Jadhav for verbally assaulting a person from Scheduled caste under the atrocities act. His camp denied allegations and called the charges politically motivated.

In Dec 2020, the Bopodi Police station lodged an FIR against him for attempted murder in a road rage incident in Aundh, Pune in which he was later granted bail and the opposing were charged under the same.

Personal life
Jadhav is the son of Late Raibhan Jadhav, a politician from Indian national congress and 
also social worker who was locally known as Krishi Maharshi'' for his agricultural work in the kannad constituency.

After series of video posts over previous months, Jadhav filed for divorce in August 2020 citing mental anguish.

Positions held
 2009: Elected to Maharashtra Legislative Assembly as member of Maharashtra Navnirman Sena
 2014: Re-elected to Maharashtra Legislative Assembly, as member of Shiv Sena

References

Maharashtra MLAs 2009–2014
Maharashtra MLAs 2014–2019
Living people
Shiv Sena politicians
People from Aurangabad district, Maharashtra
Marathi politicians
Maharashtra Navnirman Sena politicians
1978 births